Perfecto Presents: Sandra Collins is a mix album by DJ Sandra Collins, released 2003. It was released on the Thrive Records label.  It was followed by Perfecto Presents: Sandra Collins Part 2.

Track listing
Disc One

"Reshurc" - Junkie XL
"Atmosphere" - U&K
"Bubble Bath (Martin Accorsi Remix)" - Agent 001
"Reflections (Flash Brothers Remix)" - Rhythm Unlimited
"In This World (Slacker's Rain Before Carnival Remix)" - Moby
"It's Up To You (Lee Cabrera Unreleased Dub)" - Layo & Bushwacka!
"Flux" - Avedon
"No Other Man (The Greek's Remix)" - G-Pal Presents Ghos
"All In My Head (Planet Funk Remix)" - Kosheen
"Cosmic Fugue" - Voyager
"Cold Comfort (Attention Deficit's In Focus Dub)" - Curve
"Travelling On (Gabriel & Dresden Campfire Remix)" - Beber & Tamra

Disc Two

"Intro" - Sandra Collins
"Phutures (Atmos Remix)" - Saiko-Pod
"Cliff (Infusion Remix)" - Will Saul
"Me & You (Humate Remix)" - Camouflage
"Losing My Religion (Humate Remix)" - Sydney
"Bass Trap" - Quest vs. The Dirty Fours
"Desire" - Rolasoul
"Spite" - Avedon and Stig
"Just Can't Get Enough (Infusion Remix)" - Transformer 2
"Spectacle" - Voyager
"The Great Escape (Attention Deficit's Freewill Remix)" - BT featuring Caroline Lavelle

Personnel
Sandra Collins - Mixing

2003 compilation albums
Sandra Collins albums